André Liohn (born November 9, 1974) is a freelance photojournalist born in Botucatu, Brazil, frequently contributing to the publications Der Spiegel, L'Espresso, Time, Newsweek, Le Monde, Veja and others.

Biography
André Liohn lived in Botucatu, Brazil during his childhood. In his early 20s, he moved to Trondheim, Norway where he lived for 15 years. He started photographing at the age of 30. In his first years in photography, he met the Czech photographer Antonín Kratochvíl who became his personal friend and mentor, influencing his work and his views about photography.

In the 2015 article written for Vice, "A War Photographer Returns Home", Giancarlo Roma, son of American photographer Thomas Roma and grandson of photographer Lee Friedlander described André as follow: "For anyone who knows conflict photographer André Liohn, he's among the first people that comes to mind when asked the question, "Who would you want on your side in a bar fight?" Liohn is not tall, but it's clear upon meeting him that he possesses a strength, physically and otherwise, that only comes with living through true hardship. He also exclusively wears black, rides a Harley, and has a tattoo on his right forearm that reads "REFUGEE" in block letters."

In 2011 he became the first Latin American photojournalist to receive the prestigious Robert Capa Gold Medal by the Overseas Press Club for his work on the Libyan Civil War and nominated by the Prix Bayeux-Calvados des Correspondants de Guerre.
His work documenting the challenges faced by health care personal working in conflict areas has been used by the ICRC's Health Care in Danger project, denouncing cases of violence against health care personal around the world

Pulitzer Center on Crisis Reporting
In April 2010, Liohn made public the case where the Pulitzer Center on Crisis Reporting grantee and World Press Photo winner, Marco Vernaschi, forced a Ugandan mother to exhume her recently deceased child, offering payment after the fact.  Liohn learned about the case after visiting Uganda to report on cases of human sacrifices and after observing vague photo captions written by Vernaschi, that he was not present at the time of burial and had, in essence, staged a photo and offered payment in return. After notifying the Pulitzer Center and the photojournalist Anne Holmes, who subsequently removed an interview with Vernaschi that had previously been on her blog, Liohn went public on the journalist's forum Lightstalkers. The story drew more attention when Roy Greenslade wrote it up in The Guardian. As of October 2011, the Pulitzer Center remains firmly behind Vernaschi's work, although it has withdrawn several images from this and another story (where questions were raised about the ethics of showing the face and genitalia of a child who had suffered genital mutilation) and hosted a debate and discussion about the photographer's working methods, journalistic integrity, and professional ethics.

ADIL - Almost Dawn in Libya
In 2012, with fellow photographers Christopher Morris, Jehad Nga, Bryan Denton, Lynsey Addario, Eric Bouvet and Finbarr O'Reilly, he created the project Almost Dawn in Libya, four photo exhibits in the main Libyan cities of Tripoli, Benghazi, Misurata and Zintan. The project gained great media coverage and was funded partly by a crowdfunding campaign hosted by the website Emphas.is and partly by the international NGO International Medical Corps. The project's idea was to use photojournalism as a possible bridge for reconciliation in Libya after its civil war. The exhibits were curated by Italian curator Annalisa D'Angelo and photographer Paolo Pellegrin.

Books
2016 - Correspondente de Guerra co-authorship with Diogo Schelp -  Editora Contexto.
2021 - "Pandemia e Anarquia" brings together fifteen essays by researchers of libertarian practices that analyze the sociopolitical implications of the new coronavirus and its relationship with modes of existence. - Editora Hedra

Documentary
"You are not a soldier" - 2021 - In an attempt to understand what drove her father's desires to be on the frontlines, documentary director Maria Carolina Telles dives into the story of award-winning war photographer André Liohn. André was a man who struggled with his own internal grief, often choosing to immerse himself in some of the world's most notorious conflict zones. Highly decorated for his work, including the prestigious Robert Capa Gold Medal, his life takes a drastic turning point shortly after the death of his colleagues Tim Hetherington, Chris Hondros, Marie Colvin and James Foley. Having witnessed immeasurable suffering and fear, he begins to question his motives for placing himself in such danger and examines the disturbing but fine line between the life and death he has witnessed and to what end he will go to reveal those truths.

Theater
In 2014, Lelo Filho – actor, producer, director, author and one of the founders of Cia Baiana de Patifaria – challenged himself to set up the project Fora da Ordem, winner of the 2013 Myriam Muniz Award from FUNARTE, inspired by a homonymous song by Caetano Veloso. The play addresses themes such as; dictatorship, racism, homophobia, violence, holy wars, and social intolerance.

Lelo Filho was inspired by André Liohn's life story to create the character Pedrinho, a documentary filmmaker, father of two, who lives in Norway from where he leaves to cover historical events around the world.

"I found out that the same day is celebrated Theater Artist Day and World Photography Day. So I couldn't help but remember the importance of André Liohn, an incredible friend and photographer, who so inspired me to create Pedrinho, a character in FORA DA ORDER, which for me means 'redemption', the desire and optimism that Brazil can "hit the arrow, the path and get there." Not only André's work inspired me a lot, but every conversation we had about all the struggles and wars waged in the world in the name of freedom and against tyranny André supplied me with links to reports, documentaries about the Arab Spring that he covered as a photojournalist until he won the Robert Cappa Medal, the most important prize in photojournalism in the world and, to my astonishment and joy, I saw him on Jornal da Globo receiving the award in NY, wearing a tuxedo and his war boots. The characters Lyah and Marcos, in the show, represent André's two sons: Lyah and Anton. real war scene they project those on the movie screen of the set is also his, who was hit while covering that clash between civilians and the Islamic State in Libya. Thank you, my friend. It has been a beautiful encounter between Theater and Photography. Long live our friendship."

Political Views
André Liohn is an anarchist who follows the Mutualism (economic theory) political and economic theory originated from the writings of philosopher Pierre-Joseph Proudhon.

Exhibitions
2017 - REVOGO - SINTRA PRESS
2017 - Na Linha de frente - Museu da fotografia de Fortaleza (Collective)
2016 - REVOGO - lodi festival della fotografia etica - Italy 
2015 - REVOGO - Instituto Caixa Cultural - São Paulo
2015 - Assistência à Saúde em Perigo: Líbia e Somália no olhar de André Liohn" ICRC Biblioteca Parque Villa Lobos - São Paulo
2014 - FGW1414 exhibition MEMO THE FIRST GLOBAL WAR - Atlante delle Guerre e dei Conflitti del Mondo & Museo Storico del Trentino.
2014 - Assistência à Saúde em Perigo: Líbia e Somália no olhar de André Liohn" ICRC Museu Nacional Honestino Guimarães
2013 - Violence against health care through the ages - ICRC Geneve
2011 - Almost Dawn in Libya - Libya

Awards
2010 - New York Photo Festival Photographic coverage of the 2010 Haiti earthquake Series category (winner)
2010 - New York Photo Festival Photographic coverage of the 2010 Haiti earthquake Singles category (finalist)
2011 - Yonhap United Nations Millennium Awards
2012 - Robert Capa Gold Medal Award from the Overseas Press Club
2012 - National Press Photographers Association – Best of Photojournalism, 2nd in International News Picture Story
2012 - Webby Award official honoree
2012 - Bayeux-Calvados Awards for war correspondents
2017 - Norwegian Picture of the year First Prize News Reports abroad
2018 - Norwegian Picture of the year First Prize News Reports abroad
2019 - Pictures of the Year International - IMPACT 2019–IMMIGRATION STATUS | Second place
2020 - 2020 National Press Photographers Association Best of Photojournalism - News and Issues - "Inside Libya's brutal battle for control of Tripoli" | Third Place
2021 - Norwegian Picture of the year First Prize News Reports abroad

References

Sources
Prospekt Photographers
Programa Roda Viva
Robert Capa Gold Medal
Overseas Press Club
The Daily Pic: André Liohn wins the Capa Gold Medal for his Libyan photos.

Scènes de la vie quotidienne dans la Libye post-Kadhafi
World-Renowned Photographers Unveil Exhibit to Promote Peace & Rebuilding
War seen through a photographer's lens
Life of an ambulance driver in Misrata
Saving lives, healing weapons in Somalia
Red Cross: attacks on medics a 'humanitarian tragedy'

External links
"Almost Dawn in Libya" blog post by C. J. Chivers
Almost Dawn in Libya project
ICRC's Health Care in Danger project

1974 births
Living people
Brazilian photographers
War photographers
Photography in Lebanon
Photography in the State of Palestine
People from Botucatu